Alur (Dho-Alur [d̟ɔ.a.lur]) is a Western Nilotic language spoken in the southern West Nile region of Uganda and the northeastern Ituri Province of the Democratic Republic of the Congo. The language's subdialects are Jokot, Jonam/Lo-Naam (mainly spoken in the Democratic Republic of the Congo), Mambisa and Wanyoro.

Phonology 

Vowels

Alur has 9 vowels.

Consonants

Alur has 23 consonants.

Grammar

Alur has an SVO word order.

Orthography 

The Alur language has no officially accepted orthography. However, informal conventions have been established in written materials and road signs.

First, there is usually no written tonal distinction. Second, the phonemic distinction between /ŋ/ and /ng/ is occasionally reflected in the orthography, with /ŋ/ represented by 'ŋ' and /ng/ represented by 'ng'. However, /ŋ/ is also frequently written as 'ng', confusing it orthographically with /ng/.

References

External links
Examples of Alur.
The New Testament in Alur with text and recordings.

Languages of the Democratic Republic of the Congo
Languages of Uganda
Luo languages